Anjunabeats Volume 12 is the twelfth installment in the Anjunabeats Volume compilation series mixed and compiled by British trance group Above & Beyond. It was released on 18 December 2015 through Anjunabeats. It was Billboard's #4 Top Electronic Album and #45 Top Independent Album for 2016. MixMag rated the album 8/10.

Track listing

Release history

References

External links 
 Anjunabeats Volume 12 holding page

2015 compilation albums
Above & Beyond (band) albums
Anjunabeats compilation albums
Sequel albums
Electronic compilation albums